Aleksandar Marčićev (Serbian-Cyrillic: Александар Марчићев; born 11 November 1966 in Belgrade, SFR Yugoslavia) is a Serbian writer and librarian.

Life and Work
He graduated from the Department of Comparative Literature and Literary theory at the Faculty of Philology in Belgrade. He has been working as a head librarian in the Special library of the Faculty of Physical Chemistry of the University of Belgrade since 1999. He can certainly be regarded as a great unknown of contemporary Serbian literature, who has hitherto been unnoticed by the critics of the literary scene in his native country apart from a few exceptions. One of the few critics even used the claim that he would be a writer at the border of obscurity and cult, in the sense of an unknown author who is a literary recommendation of elitist circles only. Zlatoje Martinov titled his review of The Sins of Saint Max in the literary journal Bagdala of the same named circle with the headline: literary provocation sui generis, which dealt with the socio-political and cultural-philosophical dimension in Marčićev's work. In fact, the author and his literary confrontation with his contemporaries, his generation, their and ultimately his culture, has not been made easy to get to the public with his work. Although he had already been awarded for the best academic thesis of the Philological Faculty upon graduation, and was then supported by a scholarship of the Pekić Foundation (2002) and a bursary of the Ténot Foundation (2006), a total of nine publishers had refused to edit his first novel All the Lives of Zechariah Neuzinski (completed in 2002).

Marčićev writes his stories with an in-depth knowledge on literature and its literary genres, art history, history of philosophy and the general history of Europe. The first three novels, collectively called as the Weissenburg Threebook (Serbian: Vajzburškog troknjižja), are a trilogy from the irrational cabinet of curiosities of human beings. The plots of the narratives take place in Weissenburg, a city between Byzantium and Pannonia and the name of the city is the ancient German name for Belgrade, also two of the protagonists has conspicuously a German name (Max Eichmann and Victor Eisberg; Neuzinski is a neologism, combined with the German adjective new and a Slavic name suffix), all deftly applied alienation effects. The writer plays masterfully with the literary genres of Bildungsroman and autobiography from the canon of classical literatures, and even the titles of his novels creates associative connections to works such as Augustine’s Confessions, Goethe’s Poetry and Truth and his Conversations with Eckermann, Mann’s Confessions of Felix Krull or Hesse's Demian. All three novels are metaphorical confrontations with the socio-political upheavals of his country and the entire Balkans region, biographies of fictional characters whose lives are told on the one hand autobiographically and on the other biographically by contemporary witnesses or by a demiurge. They are stories about the status of culture, its actual value, its traditions and the individuals who live in it, constantly re-create and influence it through their own activities and attitudes. German history has some examples of persons who have transformed the cultural cabinet of curiosities into a chamber of nightmares: Are these places of mind called Buchenwald, Srebrenica or Weissenburg? However, this real question might be a future provocation, because these places should be alienation effects of a fictitious culture only, which no longer exists in any present. The fourth novel tells about the lives of four friends from Voždovac, who have known each other since their youth, in the mirror of historical events and radical changes such as the death of Tito, the Gazimestan speech by Milošević, the Yugoslav wars, the NATO bombing of Yugoslavia and the assassination of Zoran Đinđić. 

The novels All the Lives of Zechariah Neuzinski and Victor Eisberg: happy, despite everything have been nominated for the final selections of the Miroslav Dereta Award for the best unpublished manuscript by Dereta publishing in 2007 and 2009, the novels Saint Max and Zechariah Neuzinski for the NIN Awards 2007 and 2008.

In any case, Aleksandar Marčićev has a famous German colleague who also worked as a librarian: Gotthold Ephraim Lessing.

Works
Gresi svetog Maksa (The Sins of Saint Max), Mali Nemo, Pančevo 2007, 
Svi životi Zaharija Neuzinskog (All the Lives of Zechariah Neuzinski), Mali Nemo, Pančevo 2008, 
Viktor Ajsberg: srećan, uprkos svemu (Victor Eisberg: happy, despite everything), Mali Nemo, Pančevo 2009, 
Je l' se sećaš kad je Tito umro? (Do You Remember When Tito Died?), Mali Nemo, Pančevo 2017, .

Awards
 Danilo Kiš Award 1997 for the best academic thesis of the Philological Faculty
 Brankova nagrada Matice srpske 1997 (Branko Award of Matica srpska)
 Mali Nemo Award 2007

References

1966 births
Living people
University of Belgrade Faculty of Philology alumni
Writers from Belgrade
Serbian novelists
Serbian librarians